Oncideres sparsemaculatus is a species of beetle in the family Cerambycidae. It was described by Martins and Galileo in 2010. It is known from Guatemala.

References

sparsemaculatus
Beetles described in 2010